The Eurasian cuisine is a 'fusion' cuisine, mainly existing and found in the countries of Singapore and Malaysia.

Origins
In general, Eurasians are people of any mixed European and Asian ancestry. However, if referring to Eurasian cuisine, usually the amalgamation of Portuguese, Dutch, British, Chinese, Malay, and also Indian and Peranakan influences is meant. Within this cuisine, ingredients in European dishes are replaced or complemented by Asian ingredients. Conversely, European ingredients are used in Asian dishes.

For example, cream in European recipes is replaced by coconut cream and dried Chinese sausage (lap cheong) is used instead of chorizo. Also, the use of soy sauce, chilli and ginger is used interchangeably with vinegar, mustard and Worcestershire sauce.

Definition
There is no clear definition of what can be specified as Eurasian. Some dishes are also found in Indonesian, Malaysian, Singaporean and Chinese cuisines. By local adaptation(s), or by its ubiquitous presence within the Eurasian community, a dish is sometimes considered "Eurasian".

Dishes
 Shepherd's pie (British), a traditional dish with meat and mashed potatoes with the addition of soy sauce, oyster sauce, Chinese mushrooms and garlic.
 Oxtail stew (British), a stew with cinnamon, soy sauce and star anise.
Chicken chop, a grill-fried boneless chicken thigh marinated in a mix of soy sauce and Worcestershire sauce, usually served in a black pepper or mushroom sauce with a side of fries and vegetables.
 Devil's curry or curry debal (Portuguese), chicken in a sauce of chilli, galangal, vinegar and kemiri nuts (candle nuts).
 Kueh kochi pulot hitam, a cake of black and white glutinous rice flour with a filling of mung beans or coconut.
 Banana salad with egg, lettuce, cilantro and chili chukka (a dip of chilli, sugar, vinegar, garlic, light soy sauce and ginger).
 Curry feng, a spicy Eurasian curry dish containing minced beef or pork; minced pig’s kidney, liver, stomach, tripe and tongue; and various spices
 Semur, a type of meat stew (mainly beef), that is braised in thick brown gravy.
 Sugee cake, a semolina cake
 Putugal, a steamed rice cake

Literature
 Gomes, Mary (2009), The Eurasian Cookbook, Horizon Books, Singapore, 
 Hutton, Wendy (2003), Eurasian Favourites, Periplus Mini Cookbooks, Periplus, Singapore, 
 Pereira, Quentin (2012), Eurasian Heritage Cooking, Marshall Cavendish Cuisine, Singapore, 
 D'Silva, Damian (2012), Rebel with a Course, Ate, Singapore,

See also
 Eurasians in Singapore
 Fusion cuisine
 Indo cuisine
 Kristang people
 List of Asian cuisines

Cuisine by continent
Singaporean fusion cuisine
Malaysian fusion cuisine
European cuisine